Max Gottlieb (born 1969) is an American film and Broadway theatre producer, production designer, screenwriter, and film director. He is best known for his work on the 1997 film The Full Monty. Gottlieb was a producer on the Tony nominated Rock of Ages. He has also written about Jewish issues.

Selected filmography
Laid in America (2016)
Blitz (2011)
Beware the Gonzo (2010)
Mr. Nice (2010)
Inconceivable (2008)
Intervention (2007)
Magicians (2007)
Rag Tale (2005)
Octane (2003)
Lucky Break (2001)
Best (2000)
Still Crazy (1998)
The Very Thought of You (1998)
Raising the Heights (1998)
Shooting Fish (1997)
The Full Monty ( 1997)
I.D. ( 1995)
Shopping ( 1994)
The Turn of the Screw (1992)
Hardware (1990)
Unmasked Part 25 (1988)

References

External links

Living people
1969 births